Eupithecia pulgata is a moth in the family Geometridae first described by Paul Dognin in 1899. It is found in Ecuador.

References

Moths described in 1899
pulgata
Moths of South America